Ovatipsa rashleighana is a species of cowry, a marine gastropod in the family Cypraeidae. This species occurs in the Indian Ocean.

Subspecues
 Ovatipsa rashleighana pseudoteres (Lorenz & Barbier, 1992)
 Ovatipsa rashleighana rashleighana (Melvill, 1888)

References

Cypraeidae
Gastropods described in 1888